The Swedish Assembly of Finland (although often referred to as Folktinget even in Finnish) is an official consultative parliament representing the Swedish-speaking minority in Finland.

Elections
Elections are held every four years, and candidates are nominated by the political parties which are either bilingual or Swedish-speaking. The assembly has 75 seats, where 70 are filled on the basis of municipal election results, and five are appointed by the Parliament of Åland.

Purpose
The assembly is a forum for political discussion on issues concerning Swedish speakers, and it also functions as an interest group for Swedish-speaking population. It also engages in research on demographic issues and publishes information to the public about the situation of the Swedish-speaking Finns.

Leadership
Astrid Thors was chairperson of the Swedish Assembly of Finland 2005 – 2007. She was succeeded by Ulla-Maj Wideroos in 2007, by Anna-Maja Henriksson in 2009, by Christina Gestrin in 2011, by Thomas Blomqvist in 2015 and by Sandra Bergqvist in 2019.

See also 
Finland's language strife
Svecoman
Swedish People's Party
Yle Teema & Fem
Thing (assembly)

External links 
Swedish Assembly of Finland (in both Swedish and Finnish)
Swedish in Finland: a brochure in English and French by (and in part about) the Assembly

Swedish-speaking population of Finland
Politics of Finland